Ashkan-e Sofla (also Romanized as Ashkān-e Soflá; also known as Ashkān-e Pā'īn) is a village in Alan Rural District, in the Central District of Sardasht County, West Azerbaijan Province, Iran. At the 2006 census, its population was 19, in 5 families.

References 

Populated places in Sardasht County